Anna M. is a 2007 French thriller film, written and directed by Michel Spinosa and starring Isabelle Carré and Gilbert Melki.

Plot
Anna, a somewhat introverted woman, becomes obsessed with the orthopedic surgeon who helped with her recuperation following a car accident. Incorrectly believing the love to be reciprocated, she embarks on several attempts to stay in touch with him but, after several rejections, finds herself descending into despair and, ultimately, hatred.

Cast
 Isabelle Carré - Anna M.
 Gaëlle Bona - Éléonore
 Geneviève Mnich - Anna's mother
 Gilbert Melki - Dr. André Zanevsky
 Anne Consigny - Mrs. Zanevsky
 Pascal Bongard - The inspector
 Samir Guesmi - The receptionist
 Francis Renaud - Albert
 Éric Savin - The father

Reaction
Anthony Quinn, writing for The Independent, gave the film three out of five stars. Film4 gave it the same, calling it "entertaining".

Awards and nominations
César Awards (France)
Nominated: Best Actress – Leading Role (Isabelle Carré)
Étoile d'Or (France)
Won: Best Actress (Isabelle Carré)

See also
 Erotomania

References

External links
 

2007 films
French thriller films
2007 thriller films
2000s French films
2000s French-language films